Shororipu 2: Jotugriho is a 2021 Indian Bengali-language psychological crime-thriller written and directed by Ayan Chakraborty. It is the second film in the Shororipu franchise. Rupa Dutta is the producer and Camellia Productions is the presenter. The film stars Chiranjeet Chakraborty, Arunima Ghosh, and Saswata Chatterjee in lead roles. The story follows a girl Megha (Ghosh), who was getting ready to marry her boyfriend but in a shocking turn of events she  to marry her father’s friend Debraj. After eight years of oppressed marriage life Debraj dies in mysterious circumstances. Detective Chandrakanta (played by Chakraborty) investigates the case.

Plot 
In a shocking turn of events, Megha, who was getting ready to marry her boyfriend, must now marry Debraj, her father's friend. Eight years go by and she suffers extreme psychological turmoil until one day Debraj is found dead. Is it an accident or a murder? Detective Chandrakanta is called to investigate.

Cast 

 Chiranjeet Chakraborty as Detective Chandrakanta
 Arunima Ghosh as Megha
 Saswata Chatterjee as Debraj
 Rajesh Sharma as DCP
 Sourav Chakraborty
 Darshana Banik
 Debranjan Nag
 Biswajit Chakraborty
 Reetabrata Ghosh as Gaan-does
 Poulami Das

Production
Ayan Chakraborti introduced a new detective in Bengali films detective Chandrakanta, in his crime thriller, Shororipu. Taking forward this franchise he announced the film in December 2018 titled as Shororipu 2 : Jotugriho. Chiranjeet Chakraborty will reprise the character with Arunima Ghosh Saswata Chatterjee, Rajesh Sharma, Darshana Banik, Sourav Chakraborty, Debranjan Nag, Poulami Das, Biswajit Chakraborty playing pivotal roles. Rupam Islam is the music composer of the film.

Release 
The film released theatrically on 10 October 2021 coinciding the Puja holidays.

References 

Bengali-language Indian films
2021 films
2021 thriller films
2020s Bengali-language films
Indian detective films
Indian thriller films